This article is about the culture of Belgrade, Serbia.

Cultural events

Film 
The most significant feature film festivals in Belgrade are FEST (Belgrade Film Festival) and FAF (Auter Film Festival), while BELDOCS and Martovski Festival (Belgrade Documentary and Short Film Festival) are important documentary film festivals.

Theatre 
Held annually in September, BITEF (Belgrade Theatre Festival) is considered one of the most important theatre festivals in Europe.

Music 
Among the most popular music festivals in Belgrade are BEMUS (Belgrade Music Festival), Belgrade Beer Festival and Belgrade Jazz Festival.

Literature 
The Belgrade Book Fair is the main event related to literature in Belgrade.

Art 
BELEF (Belgrade Summer Festival) is an art festival in Belgrade.

Art 
The Nobel Prize–winning author Ivo Andrić wrote his most famous work, The Bridge on the Drina, in Belgrade. Other prominent Belgrade authors include Miloš Crnjanski, Borislav Pekić, Milorad Pavić and Meša Selimović.

Internationally Belgrade prominent artists are: Marina Abramović and Milovan Destil Marković. 

Most of Serbia's film industry is based in Belgrade, and one of the most notable films to be made there was 1995's Palme d'Or winning Underground, directed by Emir Kusturica. 

The city was one of the main centers of the Yugoslav new wave in the 1970s: VIS Idoli, Ekatarina Velika and Šarlo Akrobata were all from Belgrade. Other notable Belgrade rock acts include Riblja Čorba, Bajaga i Instruktori and others. During the 1990s the city was the main center (in the former Yugoslavia) of a musical style known as turbofolk. Today, it is the center of the Serbian hip hop scene, with acts such as Beogradski Sindikat, Škabo, Marčelo, and most of the Bassivity Music stable hailing from or living in the city.

Cultural institutions 
There are many foreign cultural institutions in Belgrade. Instituto Cervantes, Goethe-Institut and Centre Culturel Français are all located in central pedestrian Knez Mihailova Street. Other cultural centres in Belgrade are American Corner, Austrian Cultural Forum (Österreichischen Kulturforums), British Council, Confucius Institute, Canadian Cultural Center, Italian Cultural Institute (Istituto Italiano di Cultura), Culture Center of Islamic Republic of Iran, Azerbaijani Culture Center and Russian Center for Science and Culture (Российский центр науки и культуры).

See also 
 Architecture of Belgrade

References 

 
Belgrade